The Confrérie des Chevaliers du Tastevin (English: Fraternity of Knights of the Wine-Tasters' Cup) is an exclusive bacchanalian fraternity of Burgundy wine connoisseurs.

Originally formed under the Ancien Régime and re-established in 1934, the Chevaliers du Tastevin are based at the 12th-century château of the Clos de Vougeot in the Côte d'Or region of Burgundy, France.

With Chapters worldwide, called Sous-Commanderies, in view of its Gallic heritage, the Confrérie's name and ceremonial titles are usually styled in French.

History
The Confrérie, in its present form, was founded in 1934. Its origins derive from the earlier Order of the Free-Drinkers of Burgundy (Ordre des Buveurs Libres de Bourgogne). The initial idea was to reinvigorate the Burgundian wine industry during the economic turmoil prior to World War II. The first Chapitre was held on 16 November 1934 in the Caveau Nuiton at Nuits-Saint-Georges.

The American branch was established on 27 March 1940 in New York by Jules Bohy (Washington DC opened in 1946).

In 1944, the Confrérie's founding members bought the Château of the Clos de Vougeot, making it its headquarters, and then embarked upon the castle's careful renovation.

Organization 
The Confrérie is governed by a Grand Conseil of Chevaliers, headed by the Grand Maître with a secretary, known as the Grand Connétable (Louis-Marc Chevignard). In the USA, the organization delegates authority to a Grand Pilier, who is also assisted by a Grand Connétable. Candidates for membership are approved by the Grand pilier or Grand connétable, subject to confirmation by the Grand Conseil in France. New members receive the accolade by a petrified grapevine root from Burgundy.

Membership is hierarchically ranked (in descending order) from Grand officier, Officier-commandeur, Commandeur, to Chevalier. The Confrérie comprises businessmen, politicians, military leaders, diplomats, scholars, athletes, musicians and artists.

At investitures, prospective members are adorned with ornate robes similar to academic gowns worn by doctors of Theology in sixteenth-century France, before being admitted upon the following proclamation :  (English: Through Noah, Father of Vines, Bacchus, God of Wine, Saint-Vincent, Patron of Winemakers, we make admit you as a Knight of the Tastevin).

The primary aims of the organisation are "to hold in high regard and promote Burgundian produce, particularly her great wines and regional cuisine. To maintain and revive the festivities, customs and traditions of Burgundian folklore," and "to encourage people from all over the world to visit Burgundy."

Open to men and women, in 2016, there numbered about 12,000 Chevaliers worldwide (2,300 in the USA alone): there are 33 Chapitres in the United States.

Activities 

The Confrérie's activities are generally scheduled around sumptuous chapter dinners and other culinary events, where Burgundian wines are served (and occasionally other quality French wines, eg. Bordeaux, are tasted). At these events, it is customary for the Chevaliers to give detailed appraisals on the background and characteristics of each wine or dish being served; neatly described as "viticultural and gastronomic education" such critique also serves as peer review.

Each Chapitre collects and stores its own wine, with one member assigned to look after the cellar.

The principal annual event of the Confrérie is the tasting of Burgundy wines, called "Tastevinage", at the Château du Clos de Vougeot, when wines deemed worthy by a jury of tasters are awarded the accolade of "Tasteviné" and are permitted to use a special label on their bottles.

The Confrérie publishes its official magazine twice a year, Tastevin en Main.

Famous members
Valéry Giscard d'Estaing, President of France
General Charles de Gaulle, first President of the 5th French Republic
Kevin O'Leary, Canadian entrepreneur
Canon Félix Kir, Mayor of Dijon (1945–68)
Ralph Beauclerk MBE, 6th marquis de Valero de Urria
Torquhil Campbell, 13th Duke of Argyll
Nathalie Kosciusko-Morizet, French politician
Andrew Mitchell, British politician

Bibliography
Jean-Francois Bazin, Bernard Pivot, Confrerie des Chevaliers du Tastevin: 1934 - 1994, Les Editions du Tastevin (1994)

References

External links 
Official website

1703 establishments in France
1934 establishments in France
Bacchanalian fraternities
Burgundy wine
Culture of Burgundy